Juan José Jayo Legario (born 20 January 1973) is a retired Peruvian footballer who played as a defensive midfielder. As the club captain, he last played for Alianza Lima in the 2012 Torneo Descentralizado.

Club career
Jayo has played professional club football for a number of teams in South America and Spain. He has played 440 games for Alianza Lima in Peru and has had spells with Unión de Santa Fe in Argentina, then Celta de Vigo and UD Las Palmas in Spain.
In 2009, he had a 1-year contract for Alianza Lima for his last career.

International career
Jayo was a member of the Peruvian national team, and has played 98 matches and scored 1 goal since his debut in 1994.

Honours

Club 
Alianza Lima
 Torneo Descentralizado (4): 1997, 2003, 2004, 2006
 Apertura: 1997, 2004, 2006
 Clausura: 1997, 2003

References

External links

Juan Jayo at rsssf

1973 births
Living people
Footballers from Lima
Peruvian footballers
Peru international footballers
Peruvian expatriate footballers
Club Alianza Lima footballers
Unión de Santa Fe footballers
RC Celta de Vigo players
UD Las Palmas players
José Gálvez FBC footballers
Peruvian Primera División players
Argentine Primera División players
La Liga players
Peruvian expatriate sportspeople in Argentina
Peruvian expatriate sportspeople in Spain
Expatriate footballers in Argentina
Expatriate footballers in Spain
Association football midfielders
1995 Copa América players
1999 Copa América players
2000 CONCACAF Gold Cup players
2001 Copa América players
2004 Copa América players
Sport Áncash managers